The  (commonly referred to as TTI) is a university located in Nagoya, Japan. Founded in 1981 by a large endowment from Toyota Motor Corporation, it originally only accepted students with some industrial work experience.

TTI has a School of Engineering, a Master's Program, and a Doctoral Program. The programs consist of three areas of coursework: Mechanical Systems Engineering, Electronics & Information Science, and Materials Science & Engineering.

In 2003 Toyota also opened the Toyota Technological Institute at Chicago, jointly with the University of Chicago. This campus is mainly for Ph.D students, studying Machine Learning, Algorithms & Complexity, Computer Vision, Speech Technologies and Computational Biology.

TSU ranked TTI as the 5th best Japanese university in 2010 and 4th in 2011. In this ranking, TTI has a best employment rate among all Japanese Universities.

In 2012, TTI was ranked 1st in Asia in terms of average number of publication per faculty by the QS World University Rankings.

References

External links
 TTI's English Homepage
 TTI Chicago

Private universities and colleges in Japan
Universities and colleges in Nagoya
Educational institutions established in 1981
Engineering universities and colleges in Japan
Toyota